KCOT may refer to:

 KCOT (FM), a radio station (96.3 FM) licensed to serve Cotulla, Texas], United States
 Cotulla-La Salle County Airport (ICAO code KCOT)
 Keratocystic odontogenic tumour